Tim Tramnitz (born 16 November 2004) is a German racing driver who is racing for R-ace GP in the Formula Regional European Championship. He is the 2021 Italian F4 and ADAC F4 runner-up.

Career

Karting 
Tramnitz started racing in 2011, competing in local karting championships. After winning the regional Hamburg-based series and the Northern German Kart-Challenge in 2013 and 2014 respectively the German moved into national competitions, where he scored his first and only title in the ADAC Kart Academy series in 2017. He became an ADAC Stiftung Sport protégé in late 2017 and remained in karts until 2019.

Formula 4

2020 
Having tested a Formula 4 car for the first time in 2019, Tramnitz was announced to be making his single-seater debut in the ADAC Formula 4 Championship in 2020, driving with US Racing. Tramnitz had a solid season, scoring points in all but one race and finishing on the podium on six occasions, one capped off with a win in the final race of the campaign at Oschersleben. He finished fourth in the standings, beating all but one of his teammates and winning the trophy for the best rookie.

2021 

In 2021 the German returned to ADAC F4 and Italian F4, once again competing with US Racing. He experienced strong campaigns in both, scoring nine podiums in his partial campaign in the Italian series, which included two wins at the Circuit Paul Ricard and Red Bull Ring respectively. In addition, Tramnitz would come out victorious on five occasions in ADAC F4, pushing his former teammate and title rival Ollie Bearman until the final race. He finished second in both championships, despite having missed two rounds in Italian F4.

Formula Regional European Championship

2022 
For 2022, Tramnitz progressed to the Formula Regional European Championship, competing for Trident.

2023 
For 2023, Tramnitz moved over to R-ace GP in the Formula Regional European Championship.

Karting record

Karting career summary

Racing record

Racing career summary 

* Season still in progress.

Complete Italian F4 Championship results 
(key) (Races in bold indicate pole position) (Races in italics indicate fastest lap)

Complete ADAC Formula 4 Championship results 
(key) (Races in bold indicate pole position) (Races in italics indicate fastest lap)

Complete Formula Regional European Championship results 
(key) (Races in bold indicate pole position) (Races in italics indicate fastest lap)

* Season still in progress.

References

External links 
 
 

Living people
2004 births
German racing drivers
Italian F4 Championship drivers
ADAC Formula 4 drivers
Formula Regional European Championship drivers
US Racing drivers
Trident Racing drivers
Sportspeople from Hamburg
R-ace GP drivers
Formula Regional Middle East Championship drivers